Rhyzobius lophanthae, commonly known as the purple scale predator or the scale-eating ladybird, is a species of ladybird native to Queensland and Southern Australia. It was introduced into the United States in the 1890s and has since spread over the southern half of the country.

Taxonomy
This insect was first described in California in 1892 by the American entomologist Frank Ellsworth Blaisdell. He named it Scymnus lophanthae, and thought it was a native American species. Unbeknown to him, the beetle was an introduced species, and at about the same time, it was described in its native Australia by the Australian entomologist Thomas Blackburn, who gave it the name Rhizobius toowoombae. However, Blaisdell's name took precedence as it was published first, and R. toowoombae became a synonym. The specific name lophanthae means "of lophantha", referring to the plant Paraserianthes lophantha on which Blaisdell originally saw the ladybird.

Description
The head and prothorax are reddish-brown, as is the underside, both being densely covered with short hairs of two lengths. The elytra (wing cases) are blackish, often with a metallic bronze sheen. The larvae are dark brown and is clad in stout spines.

Distribution and habitat
Rhyzobius lophanthae is native to Australia where it is present in  Queensland and Southern Australia. It was introduced into California in 1892 in an attempt to control the olive scale (Saissetia oleae). It has since spread over much of the southern United States.
It can also be found in Europe.

Ecology
Both adults and larvae feed on scale insects, and especially on armoured scales at all periods of their development; they also feed on mealybugs. The younger beetle larvae crawl under the adult scale insect's protective scale, feeding on the scale nymphs before they disperse. These insects are a pest of citrus, sucking the sap from the plants, and the ladybirds have been used in biological pest control, in order to reduce the number of scale insects in the crop.

References

Coccinellidae
Beetles described in 1892